In Plato's Symposium, Penae  ("deficiency" or "poverty" in Latin) or Penia  ("deficiency" or "poverty" in Greek) was the personification of poverty and need. She married Porus at Aphrodite's birthday and was sometimes considered the mother of Eros. Her sisters are Amechania and Ptocheia. Penia was also mentioned by other ancient Greek writers such as Alcaeus (Fragment 364), Theognis (Fragment 1; 267, 351, 649), Aristophanes (Plutus, 414ff), Herodotus, Plutarch (Life of Themistocles), and Philostratus (Life of Apollonius).

Mythology

General Portrayal
Penia was the Goddess of Poverty. Although she was despised by many, she played an important role in teaching mankind to stay humble and productive. In her portrayal by the playwright Aristophanes, Penia attempts to convince two foolish men about the dangers of allowing wealth to be abundant for everybody. She debates the issue of motivation among those who are wealthy; by acquiring a luxurious life, humans will not see a need to put in effort to produce goods and products. She explains that there will come a time where mankind will not be able to purchase much of anything because of low supply, and people will end up working significantly harder than before in order to obtain food or build furniture. She understands that she is resented, but also knows that she is vital for maintaining the continuity of mankind.

Plato's account
Perhaps one of the most famous mentions is in Plato's Symposium (203b-e), a Socratic Dialogue written by Plato c. 385–370 BC. She is part of a story narrated by Socrates, that he originally heard from a priestess by the name of Diotima. There, Penia appears during a banquet thrown by the gods to celebrate the birth of Aphrodite, in order to beg. In the hope for alleviating her misery, she sleeps with Poros, god of wealth, while he is intoxicated from drinking too much nectar, however, she unintentionally gives birth to Eros, God of Love; who is a combination of both his parents, in that he is forever in need and forever pursuing.

Notes 

Greek goddesses
Personifications in Greek mythology